Marika Száraz (born 1947 in Zalaegerszeg, Hungary) is a Hungarian textile artist and curator.

Life 
Száraz trained in tapestry at the Institute of Applied Arts in Budapest. From 1968, she worked at the Applied Arts Company, and made tapestries based on the designs of Endre Domanovszki and Gyula Hinz. From 1976  she studied at the Royal Academy of Fine Arts in Brussels, with Jacques Moeschal. She obtained a master's degree at La Cambre.

In 1990, on a scholarship from the SPES Foundation, she studied at the John F. Kennedy University. From 1997 to 1999, she worked to restore tapestry at the Royal Academy of Art, The Hague.

She is also active as a curator of textile exhibitions, for the Ildik-Dobrinyi Foundation. She curated the travelling exhibition Asia-Europe.

She lives in Brussels.

Exhibitions 
 Textile miniatures - exhibition of Croatian and Hungarian textile artists, 2018 
 Exhibition of Marika Száraz: Timeless Moment, 2021

References

External links 
 

1947 births
Living people
20th-century Hungarian women artists
21st-century Hungarian women artists
20th-century women textile artists
20th-century textile artists
21st-century women textile artists
21st-century textile artists
Académie Royale des Beaux-Arts alumni
People from Zalaegerszeg
Tapestry artists